Frenchmans Cap is a mountain in the West Coast region of Tasmania, Australia. The mountain is situated in the Franklin-Gordon Wild Rivers National Park.

Location
The mountain lies east of the West Coast Range, yet due to its prominence, it can be seen from Macquarie Harbour. It lies south of the Lyell Highway from which it can be viewed from various locations, and south west of Cradle Mountain-Lake St Clair National Park.

The peaks of the Frenchmans area include Frenchmans Cap, Clytemnestra and Philps Peak (both ), and Philps Ridge.

Etymology
The mountain lies in the traditional lands of the Aboriginal Tasmanians, most likely the Toogee nation. The traditional names for Frenchmans Cap are trullenuer (trul.len.neur), toindy (toin.dy) or mebbelek.

Even though the peak was an early landmark for ships sailing the west coast, the first recorded use of Frenchmans Cap was in 1822 in connection with Macquarie Harbour Penal Station, from where the peak was visible. The origin of the name is attributed to its appearance from some angles as looking like a Frenchman's cap, notably the Liberty cap worn during the French Revolution (1789–1799).

A variation of that was reported by Henry Widdowson, who wrote in 1829 that the name was derived from "its generally being covered with snow and bearing some resemblance to the shape of dress which invariably adorns the head of a French Cook".

History

The distinctive shape of the mountain was used as a guiding beacon by many, largely unsuccessful, parties of escaping convicts as they attempted to struggle through the dense scrub of Western Tasmania to the settled districts further east. It was mentioned as a geographical reference in the account later dictated by convict Alexander Pearce to authorities, following his capture.

The earliest European recorded to have ascended was James Sprent and his trigonometrical party in 1853.

In 1941 the Frenchmans Cap National Park was created and its boundary was in effect the Franklin River. This park was subsumed into the Franklin-Gordon Wild Rivers National Park in the 1990s.

The country around the mountain is invariably referred to by the books and the material written about the Franklin River. Johnson Dean's book gives a graphic account with maps and pictures the nature of the country.

Access
Access to the mountain is usually via a multi-day bushwalk from the Lyell Highway. Parks and Wildlife Service and other authorities in Tasmania give advice about the access and preparation needed – due to the changing conditions of the area.
The track is repeatedly overgrown, due to the vegetation and the rainfall of the area.

The walk to the peak along the well marked track typically takes two days. The first day of about  will bring walkers to Lake Vera Hut. Water is plentiful (and drinkable) in all seasons. Walk time from Lyell Highway to Lake Vera is between six and eight hours. This part of the walk was historically very difficult, including two steep and prolonged ascents separated by the boggy Loddon Plains. The so-called "Sodden Loddons" were almost always muddy and crossing them took two hours or more. In wet weather the mud was frequently waist high, while in the dry it was only knee high. However, since 2013 track upgrades have seen the North Loddon Planes duckboarded, and the trail diverted around the South Loddon Plains through Philps Lead. This has allowed for significant environmental rejuvenation and reduced the difficulty of the first day. It was financed by donations from Dick Smith after he visited and was dismayed with the state of the trail.

After walking along the shores of Lake Vera the next two hours are spent struggling up the steep inclines to Barron Pass. Once on top the walker is presented with a dramatic view of Frenchmans Cap. From Barron Pass it is approximately another two hours to Tahune Hut, depending on fitness and pack weight. Water is often plentiful before Barron Pass, but scarce from there until reaching Lake Tahune. Walk time from Lake Vera to Lake Tahune is about four hours.

There are two lakes on the way to the summit – Lake Vera, and Lake Tahune – there are huts at both of these locations. Lake Vera Hut was built in 1979 and sleeps 20 people in two two-tier bunk configurations. It is heated by a coal stove. 

Three huts have been built at Lake Tahune. Tahune #1 was built shortly after WW2 - it was destroyed by a bushfire in 1966. Tahune #2 was completed in 1971 - a prefabricated design that slept 16 people snugly, also in two two-tier bunks and was heated by a coal fuel stove.  The hut was replaced in 2018 by Tahune #3 - an architecturally designed building that boasts excellent thermal properties as well as a hydro-electric power supply. Tahune #3 sleeps 24 people comfortably with heating provided by electric ceiling panels.  From Tahune, the summit is an ~2.5hr return trip - this should only be attempted in good weather.

If the weather is clear the view includes the West Coast beaches, Lake Burbury and the many peaks – such as Tasmania's tallest, Mount Ossa – in the Cradle Mountain-Lake St Clair National Park.

The  plus walk to Frenchmans Cap is typically completed as a return trip on the same track.

Alternative access
There is an option to make it a round trip by walking on from Lake Tahune to the Franklin River at Irenabyss, crossing the river and exiting at Victoria Pass, which is also on the Lyell Highway. The walk from Irenabyss to Victoria Pass traverses rugged country and is recommended only for highly experienced parties. Many parties visit Irenabyss as a long day walk. Lake Tahune to Irenabyss takes about 4 hours. Irenabyss to Victoria Pass takes about 12 hours.

Climbing
For climbers, Frenchmans Cap offers a variety of trad routes on generally sound, quartzite rock.

Serious climbing has occurred since the 1960s, as detailed in a 1990 article in Rock by Stephen Bunton. Jon Nermuts Tasmanian climbing page serves as the main information resource for routes on the main face as well as  Gerry Narkowicz's description in Climb Tasmania.

Painting and photography
Frank Hurley's black and white images from the 1950s which are in the National Library online collection, are probably the most evocative and easily accessible images close up of the features around Frenchmans Cap.

Literature
Barry Maitland's 2008 mystery novel Bright Air contains a vivid description of a climb of Frenchmans Cap. It also features in For the Term of His Natural Life by Marcus Clarke and the non-fiction book Hell's Gates: The terrible journey of Alexander Pearce, Van Diemen's Land cannibal by Paul Collins (Hardie Grant, 2002). A more recent book is by Simon Kleinig in 2012.

See also

 List of highest mountains of Tasmania
 Walk to the West

References

Further reading

External links
 Histories of Lake Tahune Hut and Lake Vera Hut.
 
 
 
 
 

Mountains of Tasmania
Hiking and bushwalking tracks in Tasmania
Climbing areas of Australia
Franklin-Gordon Wild Rivers National Park